The following lists events that happened during 1832 in New Zealand.

Incumbents

Regal and viceregal
Head of State – King William IV
Governor of New South Wales – Major-General Sir Richard Bourke

Government and law
British Resident in New Zealand – James Busby is appointed in March but does not arrive in New Zealand until 10 May 1833.

Events 
19 April – Construction of the Stone Store at Kerikeri begins.
December – Missionary Henry Williams records the first mention of cricket being played in New Zealand, on the beach at Paihia.

Undated
 The Weller brothers whaling station at Otakou is destroyed by fire before whaling operations have begun. It is soon rebuilt. (see 1831 & 1835)
Ngāti Toa under chief and war leader Te Rauparaha capture and destroy the Ngāi Tahu stronghold of Kaiapoi pa.
 Te Rauparaha and Ngāti Toa capture the Ngāi Tahu pā at Onawe on Akaroa harbour and massacre the inhabitants.
Ngā Puhi attack Otumoetai pā.
British merchant and ship owner Captain James Clendon buys land and sets up a trading station at Okiato in the Bay of Islands. The location would be renamed Russell and become the first capital of New Zealand in 1840.

Births
 14 March (in Scotland): Sir James Fergusson, 6th Baronet, 6th Governor of New Zealand.
 20 November William Gilbert Mair, soldier and judge 
Unknown date
 Frederic Jones, politician.
 (in England): John Davies Ormond, politician.
Elizabeth Mary Palmer, New Zealand music and singing teacher, performer, composer, and entertainment promoter.
 Arthur Seymour, politician, Superintendent of Marlborough.
 Alexander Sligo, politician.
 Thomas Thompson''', politician.
Approximate
 Te Kooti, Māori leader, religion founder and guerilla.

Deaths
 6 August: Thomas Kendall, Missionary and Pākehā Māori

See also
List of years in New Zealand
Timeline of New Zealand history
History of New Zealand
Military history of New Zealand
Timeline of the New Zealand environment
Timeline of New Zealand's links with Antarctica

References

External links